Blinding White Noise: Illusion & Chaos is the debut album by progressive metal band Skyharbor. It was released on April 23, 2012, through Basick Records. This is a double-disc album. Daniel Tompkins (who would later join Skyharbor) performed vocal duties on disc one (Illusion), and Sunneith Revankar (Bhayanak Maut) performed vocal duties on disc two (Chaos). The album features several guest appearances, including Marty Friedman (ex-Megadeth) who performed guitar solos on 'Catharsis' and 'Celestial'. Vishal J. Singh of Amogh Symphony contributed a classical guitar solo on 'Celestial' as well. New Zealand based musician and renowned producer Zorran Mendonsa played additional guitars on 'Trayus'. Disc 2 (Chaos) features largely harsh vocals with the occasional clean sung chorus, while Disc 1 (Illusion) features almost entirely clean vocals.

Track listing

Disc one

Disc two

Personnel

Skyharbor
 Keshav Dhar - Guitars, Bass, Drum programming, Production & Mixing

Additional musicians
 Daniel Tompkins - Vocals and Lyrics on Disc One
 Sunneith Revankar - Vocals and Lyrics on Disc Two
 Marty Friedman - Guitar Solos on 'Catharsis' and 'Celestial'
 Vishal J. Singh - Guitar Solo on 'Celestial'
 Zorran Mendonsa - Additional Guitars on 'Trayus'

References

2012 debut albums
Skyharbor albums
Basick Records albums